Dogs in the Vineyard is an independently published role-playing game loosely based on the history of the Mormons. It was written by D. Vincent Baker and published by Lumpley Games.

In the 2004 Indie RPG Awards, Dogs in the Vineyard was awarded Indie RPG of the Year and Most Innovative Game. In 2005 it was nominated for a Diana Jones Award for Excellence in Gaming. It generally encourages narrativist play.

Setting 
The game is set in "a West that never quite was"—loosely based on the Mormon State of Deseret in pre-statehood Utah. Players are "God's Watchdogs" ("Dogs"), who travel from town to town delivering mail, helping out the community and enforcing the judgments of the True Faith of the King of Life. This may involve anything from delivering new interpretations to the town's Steward to executing heretics. Dogs have absolute authority within the Faith, but not within the laws of the Territorial Authority, and so their actions can lead to conflict with the government in the East.

System 
The game features a form of conflict resolution in which die rolls are used in poker-style bids.

Characters' statistics and traits are represented by dice pools. At the start of a conflict, the Gamemaster and other players decide what is at stake, determine which pools are applicable, and those are rolled at that point. The character with the initiative puts forward a "raise" of two dice, while narrating a portion of the conflict which is beneficial to their character's position in the conflict.  The opponent must respond by putting forward one or more dice whose total exceeds the total of the dice which were used to raise, or "give"—i.e. lose the conflict. If three or more dice are needed, the opponent suffers "fallout"—a negative outcome to be determined  at the end of the conflict. If only one die is needed by the opponent, the attack has been "turned against the attacker" and the die can be reused to raise in the next round.  The opponent now begins a round by putting forward two dice which the first character must match, and so on until one player or the other gives.  Players may bring in new dice by "escalating" the conflict, from non-physical (discussion) to physical (running away) to brawling and then to gunfighting.  If the conflict didn't start with non-physical, players may de-escalate from gunfighting to discussion, though it occurs only rarely.  The GM's set of rules in conflict is very simple: "Say yes, or roll dice."

During the "Town Creation" segment, the moral landscape of the town is laid out in the form of characters, their desires, and what they've done to each other which allows players to  engage in the town without making wins or losses the only object of play.

Reception
Shannon Appelcline comments on this game A story of God's Watchdogs, trying to preserve the faithful on the hostile frontier of the 19th century. This was one of the first indies to be notably successful, both financially and sociologically. It introduced the idea of 'say yes or roll', where GMs either went along with player suggestions, or gave them opportunity to occur through a die roll. Dogs was also notable for its revolutionary game design and for its existence as both an adventure story and a morality tale, all backed up by those mechanics. It truly captured the imagination of the indie field following its release.

Out of Print & Derivatives
Dogs in the Vineyard is no longer available for sale, in either print or digital formats, because of Baker's dissatisfaction with the setting. Baker indicated that he has considered a new edition or sequel that would extricate the system from the setting, but work has not begun.

In 2019, Baker gave tacit approval for KN Obaugh to publish a setting-free version of the game's system, DOGS (the Dice pool and mOral predicament based Generic roleplaying System!)

References

External links  
 Lumpley Games' home page for Dogs in the Vineyard
 Lumpley Games Forum on The Forge, mostly concerned with DitV

Historical role-playing games
Indie role-playing games
Role-playing games introduced in 2004
Latter Day Saints in popular culture
Historical Western role-playing games